The Nissan FD engine is used primarily for Nissan Truck and Bus commercial vehicles. It is of an inline-four layout.

FD33

 at 3600 rpm
 at 2000 rpm

Nissan Atlas (H40) 1984-1986

FD33T
turbodiesel
 at 3600 rpm
 at 2000 rpm

Nissan Atlas (H40) 1983-1986 
Nissan Civilian (W40) 1984-1988

FD35

 at 3500 rpm
 at 2000 rpm

Nissan Atlas (H40) 1986-1991

FD35T
turbodiesel
 at 3500 rpm
 at 2000 rpm

Nissan Atlas (SGH40) 1986-1991

FD42

 at 3200 rpm
 at 2000 rpm

Nissan Atlas (H41) 1991-1995

FD46T

DOHC 8-valve

 at 3000 rpm
 at 1800 rpm

Nissan Atlas (H41) 1991-1995

See also
 List of Nissan engines

References

FD
Straight-four engines
Diesel engines by model